Arnold Poepke (born 25 November 1901 in Kaminsker Hauland, Kreis Obornik - 14 July 1989 in Northeim) was a German politician and member of the CDU.

After attending school, Pöpke completed an apprenticeship as a locksmith, and first worked as a locksmith in Poznań and later switched to the Friedrich Krupp AG in Essen. He spent some time at  the Evangelical-Social School in Spandau and was active from 1923 to 1933 as a Protestant workers and association secretary. At the same time, from 1929 to 1933, he attended evening high schools in Kassel and Berlin. Then he began to study political science and economics, graduating in 1937 with a doctorate.

From 1939 to 1945, he participated as a soldier in the Second World War. When the war ended, he went into Soviet captivity, but was discharged in 1948.

After 1951, Pöpke was managing director of the Protestant working class movement. He also served as executive chairman of the Institute of Labor Education in Essen.

Pöpke belonged to the German Bundestag from 1961 to 1965. He was also a representative of the North Rhine-Westphalia Landtag.

See also
List of German Christian Democratic Union politicians

References

External links
 Christlich Demokratische Union Deutschlands web site

1901 births
1989 deaths
Christian Democratic Union of Germany politicians